Nosoderma sylvaticum is a beetle, belonging to the genus Nosoderma.

References

Zopheridae
Beetles described in 2006